Disney's Art of Animation Resort is a resort within Walt Disney World Resort in Lake Buena Vista, Florida. It is located where construction on the unfinished half of Disney's Pop Century Resort was started but later abandoned after the September 11 attacks. It is considered a value resort.

The resort is the first to be built in the complex in over seven years and the fifth to be placed in the value-priced category, along with Disney's All-Star Sports Resort, the All-Star Music Resort, the All-Star Movies Resort, and Disney's Pop Century Resort. Family suites opened on May 31, 2012, and standard rooms opened on September 15, 2012.

Overview

Originally, the land the Art of Animation Resort occupies was planned to be part of Disney's Pop Century Resort as part of the "Legendary Years" section. Several buildings were constructed for these plans, some even to the point of adding decorative details. While one-half of Pop Century (the "Classic Years") opened in 2003, the other half was left abandoned following the tourism halt after the September 11 attacks on the United States. It was also home to the Epcot Center Ultralight Flightpark, a small airport owned by Disney.

Disney started to prepare the land for the resort in January 2010, and construction began in the summer of that year. At the time of this announcement on May 12, 2010, Disney did not say how much construction is expecting to cost, but it was mentioned that approximately 800 jobs would be produced.

When the "Legendary Years" buildings were first being made, a bridge originally named the Generation Gap Bridge was constructed to connect both parts of Pop Century and made them accessible to each other. The bridge, today unnamed, connects Pop Century to the Finding Nemo section of the Art of Animation Resort. This bridge contains a terminal for the Disney Skyliner aerial gondola system.

Theming
The resort is designed "with families in mind." It features four of Disney's popular character themes: Cars, Finding Nemo, The Lion King, and The Little Mermaid. Much like the other Disney Value Resorts, giant versions of various items are built around the hotel on each of the ten wings, such as a  model of King Triton. In total, there are 1,984 rooms, of which 1,120 are family suites capable of housing up to six people, featuring living rooms and bedrooms. The remaining 864 sport the standard value layout. The resort has a total of ten buildings, as well as three themed pools. "The Big Blue Pool" is the largest hotel pool in all of Walt Disney World Resort.
 Finding Nemo: The Finding Nemo section of the resort is themed with the ocean setting featured in the film, with underwater plant and animal decorations throughout the buildings. This is the first area of the resort, which opened on May 31, 2012.
 Cars: The Cars section of the resort is themed like the Cozy Cone Motel that was featured in the film. Resort buildings are themed with the movie's characters, including Lightning McQueen, Sally, Mater, and Luigi and Guido. The second section of the resort opened on June 18, 2012.
 The Lion King: The Lion King section of the resort features a "natural" setting, such as that found in the wild. The third section of the resort opened its doors on August 10, 2012.
 The Little  Mermaid: The Little Mermaid section of the resort is themed with 600 cutout objects on resort balconies. "Under the Sea" decorations are incorporated throughout the section. This section of the resort has exterior walkways, where the other sections have enclosed interior walkways between the rooms. (This section uses two buildings that were originally built for Pop Century's "Legendary Years" section before construction halted, which left them unfinished for years.) It opened on September 15, 2012, as the fourth and final section of the resort.

Dining and shopping
 Landscape of Flavors  - a food court selling American cuisine and deli style market items. The Landscape of Flavors Food Court serves omelets, pancakes, French toast, pizza, pasta, sandwiches, salads, burgers, burritos, ice cream and bakery items. The food court seats 606 people.
 Pizza Delivery - pizza, sandwiches, salad, dessert and beverages are available in the evening for delivery to guest rooms.
 Ink & Paint Shop - gift shop that offers a range of items from Disney souvenirs to Disney's Art of Animation themed clothing. The store also has grocery section that sells items including snacks, liquor, drinks, and sundries.

Gallery

Incidents
On July 14, 2015, a three-year-old boy was found at the bottom of a resort pool after becoming separated from his parents. Officials with the Orange County Sheriff's Office reported the child was later pronounced dead at an area hospital.

References

External links
 
 Art of Animation Photo Gallery at HanBan Photos

Art of Animation Resort
Hotel buildings completed in 2012
2012 establishments in Florida